A Lady of Quality is a lost 1913 silent film drama directed by J. Searle Dawley and starring stage star Cissy Loftus. It was produced by Daniel Frohman and Adolph Zukor, was based on the 1896 novel A Lady of Quality by Frances Hodgson Burnett, and was among the first of his feature-length productions.

Cast
Cecilia Loftus - Clorinda Wildairs
House Peters - The Duke of Osmonde
Peter Lang - Sir Jeoffrey Wildairs
Hal Clarendon - Sir John Oxen
Geraldine O'Brien - Sister Anne
Roy Pilcher - Earl of Dunstandwolde (*as Roy Pilser)
David Wall - Lord Eldershawe (*as Dave Wall)
Alexander Gaden - Lord Twemlow
Henrietta Goodman - Peasant Girl
Edna May Weick - Clorinda, age 7 (*as Edna Weick)

See also
List of Paramount Pictures films
A Lady of Quality (1924)

References

External links
 A Lady of Quality at IMDb.com
 surviving lobby poster

1913 films
American silent feature films
Lost American films
Films based on American novels
Films based on British novels
American films based on plays
Films based on works by Frances Hodgson Burnett
Films directed by J. Searle Dawley
Famous Players-Lasky films
Silent American drama films
1913 drama films
Films based on multiple works
American black-and-white films
1913 lost films
Lost drama films
1910s American films